Juan Martín del Potro was the defending champion, but chose not to participate that year.

Seeds

Draw

Finals

Top half

Bottom half

External links
Draw
Qualifying Draw

Singles